The 2000–01 St. John's Red Storm men's basketball team represented St. John's University during the 2000–01 NCAA Division I men's basketball season. The team was coached by Mike Jarvis in his third year. St. John's home games are played at Carnesecca Arena, then called Alumni Hall, and Madison Square Garden and the team is a member of the Big East Conference.

Off season
Mike Jarvis had turned down an offer from Michael Jordan in the offseason to become the head coach of the Washington Wizards to return for his 3rd season and rebuild a team that lost Bootsy Thornton and Lavor Postell to graduation, Erick Barkley to the pros and recruit Darius Miles altogether for the 2000 NBA draft.

Departures

Class of 2000 signees

Roster

Schedule and results

|-
!colspan=9 style="background:#FF0000; color:#FFFFFF;"| Exhibition

|-
!colspan=9 style="background:#FF0000; color:#FFFFFF;"| Non-Conference Regular Season

|-
!colspan=9 style="background:#FF0000; color:#FFFFFF;"| Big East Conference Regular Season

|-
!colspan=9 style="background:#FF0000; color:#FFFFFF;"| Big East tournament

Team players drafted into the NBA

References

St. John's Red Storm men's basketball seasons
St. John's
St. John's Red Storm men's b
St. John's Red Storm men's b